Trinity is a district of northern Edinburgh, Scotland, once a part of the burgh of Leith (itself a part of the city since 1920). It is one of the outer villa suburbs of Edinburgh mainly created in the 19th century.  It is bordered by Wardie to the west and north-west, Newhaven to the north-east, Victoria Park to the east and Bangholm to the south.

Origin

The name derives from Trinity House in Leith, which formerly held these lands and had a large estate farm, Trinity Mains, in the area. The coat of arms from the farm is preserved on the gable of a modern block on Newhaven Main Street.

Although having some buildings from the 18th century, the area was largely developed in the early 19th century, as a mansion house district, broadly comparable in style to The Grange area of Edinburgh (Trinity is sometimes referred to as Leith's Grange). Many buildings were "second homes" to rich families in the New Town and were treated as a "country retreat".

The style of housing is now very mixed, as the area has always been seen as desirable, and developers have accordingly been keen to build, usually in the preferred architectural style of their period.[citation needed] Victoria Park adds to the area's amenities as do many cycle paths and walkways derived from the city's disused northern suburban railway lines. East Trinity Road is typical in having property types ranging from original mansions, Victorian terraces and tenements, cottages to modern developments. Craighall Crescent has a Victorian crescent on one side of the street with much later houses on the other side.

Buildings of interest

The remnant northeast wing of the 15th century Wardie Castle (later Wardie House) survives on Wardie House Lane. This was rebuilt in 1780 by Sir Alexander Boswall who gives his name to Boswall Road.

Numbers 17 to 23 Boswall Road were built in 1815. The westmost wing (containing a telescope viewing area to the harbour) was his own house. The central and east blocks were built as the Pollock Missionary School. The doorpiece on number 21 seems a later addition to embellish this otherwise plain block.

The most notable building on Boswall Road was Wardie Lodge, later renamed Challenger Lodge by Sir John Murray in 1914, after his Challenger Expedition investigating abyssal lifeforms in the deep oceans. After use as a children's home, it was converted to St Columba's Hospice, providing care for the terminally ill, in 1977. Although still extant, the original lodge is now subsumed by modern buildings for the hospice.

11 Boswall Road, East Cottage, dates from the 17th century and was a part-time summer home for Professor John Wilson pen-named "Christopher North".

From 1821 to 1898 the Trinity Chain Pier was used by ferries and latterly swimmers. The booking office survives as a pub. Trinity railway station still survives, up a lane opposite, but is converted to residential use.

Wardie Parish Church is one of several Church of Scotland churches in Trinity.

Trinity Academy (originally called Craighall Road Public School) was built in 1894 and is one of the older schools of the city but has large modern extensions on its east side.

Trinity Cottage (the home of Christian Salvesen) was demolished in 1969) and replaced by National Health Service (NHS) offices. It in turn was demolished in 2008 and replaced by modern townhouses. Only the enclosing wall and small south lodge exist from the original structure.

Notable residents

 Allan Ker VC (1883-1958) lived at St Abbs on Russell Place
 James McBain FRSE (1807-1879) Royal Navy surgeon and naturalist, lived his final years in Trinity and died at Logie Villa on York Road
 Dr James Russell FRSE (1754-1836) lived at Bangholm Bower House.
 John Wilson FRSE (1877-1959) architect, lived at 20 Lomond Road

See also
 The city's Trinity House Maritime Museum, run by Historic Environment Scotland, is not in the Trinity area and should not be confused with Trinity Park House.

References

External links
Bartholomew's Chronological map of Edinburgh (1919)
 Trinity House Maritime Museum

Areas of Edinburgh
Leith